= Bhungroo =

Bhungroo (meaning "straw" in Gujarati) is an innovative water harvesting technique for irrigation introduced by Indian women farmers. It frees excess water from flood prone and waterlogged farmland by drawing all the excess water underground and making land accessible for farming.

== Advantages ==
The water stored during rainy season in unsaturated layers of soils can be pumped for farming in dry season, hence farmers can have dual season farming.

== Disadvantages ==
The direct injection of runoff water can also carry unused fertilizers and pesticides remaining in the soil. This leads to contamination of subsurface aquifers.

The farm chemicals containing urea can also alter pH of subsurface water and pollute the water.
